Thieves is a silent film released in 1919. It was directed by Frank Beal. Douglas Bronston wrote the screenplay and Will C. Beale the story. The cast includes Gladys Brockwell, William Scott, Hayward Mack, Jean Calhoun, W. C. Robinson, Bobby Starr, John Cossar, Yukio Aoyama, and Marie James. The plot involves a crook gone straight and a love story.

Cast
 Gladys Brockwell as Mazie Starrett
 William Scott as Jimmy Britton
 Hayward Mack as Henry Hartland
 Jean Calhoun as Allison Cabot
 W. C. Robinson as Spike Robinson
 Bobby Starr as The Rat
 John Cossar as Inspector
 Yukio Aoyama as Valet
 Marie James as Maid

References

External links
 
 
 

1919 films
Fox Film films
American black-and-white films
American silent feature films
Films directed by Frank Beal
1910s American films